Alan Jousseaume (born 3 August 1998) is a French cyclist, who currently rides for UCI ProTeam .

Major results
2020
 2nd Tour du Jura
 3rd Overall Ronde de l'Isard
2021
 1st Tour du Jura
 6th Overall Tour Alsace
2022
 9th Classic Loire Atlantique

References

External links

1998 births
Living people
French male cyclists
Sportspeople from Vannes